Zoltan Zoltanovich Miles was a Soviet footballer of Hungarian origin who played as a goalkeeper. He had 64 top-flight appearances with FC Lokomotiv Moscow captaining the team for years, having gained fame as a  penalty killer during his spell in Moscow and also kept 89 clean sheets, a club record later beaten by Sergei Ovchinnikov. Zoltan had a younger brother, Vasily (born 1946), who enjoyed a lengthy career as a striker and earned 8 top-flight appearances at FC Shakhtar Donetsk.

References

External links
 
 Captains | FC Lokomotiv

1944 births
1997 deaths
People from Mukachevo
Soviet footballers
FC Spartak Ivano-Frankivsk players
FC Avanhard Ternopil players
FC Dynamo Kyiv players
FC Chayka Sevastopol players
FC Lokomotiv Moscow players
FC Zimbru Chișinău players
Association football goalkeepers
Russian people of Hungarian descent